Philippe Klein is a French born engineer and businessman. He currently serves as Chief Planning Officer of the multi-national Japanese automobile manufacturer Nissan.

Education

Born in 1957, Klein was educated at the École Supérieure de Physique et de Chimie Industrielles de la ville de Paris (The City of Paris Industrial Physics and Chemistry Higher Educational Institution) where he obtained his diploma in 1980. He gained a higher level diploma from the École Nationale Supérieure du Pétrole et des Moteurs (National Higher Educational Institution of Oil and Engines).

Career

In 1981, Klein started his career at Renault as an engineer in the Engine Development Department. In 1992, he was appointed executive assistant to the chairman. In 1999, Renault entered into a partnership with the Japanese auto-maker Nissan. The two corporations took minority shareholdings in one another and embarked on a sustained programme of technical and commercial collaboration which included the exchange of senior executives. At this point, Klein relocated to Tokyo, joining Nissan as a vice-president. He subsequently progressed to the position of Senior Vice-President, remaining with Nissan until 2003.

In 2003, he was appointed "Vice President, Industrial System Performance Department" with Renault. In September 2008, Philippe Klein was appointed "Deputy Director General Product Planning, Programs" of the Renault Group. Until 2014 he was "Executive Vice President, Product Planning, Programs" and, from 2005 to 2014, a member of the company's Executive Management Committee.

In September 2014, his appointment was announced as chief planning officer and member of the executive committee at Nissan, in succession to Andy Palmer.

References

1957 births
People in the automobile industry
Renault people
Living people